General Travers may refer to:

James Travers (1820–1884), British Indian Army general
Paul Travers (1927–1983), British Army lieutenant general
Robert Travers (MP) (c. 1596–1647), Irish general